"System of Survival" is a song by the band Earth, Wind & Fire issued as a single in October 1987 on Columbia Records. The single reached number one on both the Billboard Hot Dance Music/Club Play chart and Billboard Hot R&B Singles chart. "System of Survival" also reached No. 9 on the New Zealand Pop Singles chart, No. 14 on the Dutch Pop Singles chart and No. 25 on the Belgian Pop Singles chart.

Overview
"System of Survival" was produced by Maurice White and Preston Glass and composed by an unknown songwriter called Skylark.

The single's B-side was a non-album song called "Writing on the Wall". "System of Survival" was released on EWF's 1987 studio album Touch the World.

Critical reception
Jon Pareles of the New York Times described the song as having "a groove out of James Brown by way of Prince". Andrew Panos of Number One gave the song a four out of five star rating saying "The layoff has seen the EWF lads gain a bit of a social conscience as they sing here of the sufferings of the world and what a depressing place it is. You can however, ease your troubles if you have a nip out onto the dancefloor once in a while and jig along to splendid thumping disco tunes such as this".
John Milward of USA Today proclaimed that the song "boasts a clean dance groove". Richard Lowe of Smash Hits wrote "now they've back with a thumping great funk thing called System of Survival which is all about how terrible a place the world is and all that and how strutting one's 'stuff' is quite a good way of enjoying yourself despite it all. Just to make it more modern and 'trendy' they've got this bit with someone talking  on the radio on it, and its going to be a roaring success, which is only right and 'proper'." Chris Heim of the Chicago Tribune found that "the ebullient celebration of everyone as a Shining Star has given way to the grimmer task of constructing a System of Survival". Dave Hill of The Independent exclaimed "System of Survival is a blissfully erudite single." Connie Johnson of the Los Angeles Times declared that the tune is "packed with energy and passion". Cashbox called "System of Survival" a "blistering rock/funk outing". 
Roe Hoeburger of Rolling Stone also described the song as "a Stayin' Alive for the eighties".

Credits
Horns – Gary Grant, Marc Russo, Wayne Wallace
Horns, Arranged By – Jerry Hey
Lead Vocals, Backing Vocals – Philip Bailey
Lead Vocals, Backing Vocals, Vocoder – Maurice White
Producer, Electric Guitar, Synthesizer, Drum Programming – Preston Glass
Written-By, Drum Programming, Synthesizer, Backing Vocals – Skylark

Chart positions

Accolades

References

1987 singles
1987 songs
Earth, Wind & Fire songs
New jack swing songs
Columbia Records singles